Nowy Sącz is a city in the Lesser Poland Voivodeship of southern Poland. It is the district capital of Nowy Sącz County as a separate administrative unit. It has a population of around 83,116 as of 2021.

Names
Nowy Sącz has been known in German as Neu Sandez and in Hungarian as Újszandec. The Rusyn name was Novyj Sanc. Its Yiddish names include צאַנז (Tsanz) and נײַ-סאַנץ (Nay-Sants).

Geography
It is surrounded by ranges of the eastern Outer Western Carpathian Mountains: Beskid Sądecki to the south, Beskid Wyspowy to the west, Beskid Niski to the southeast, and the foothills of Pogórze Rożnowskie to the north. The geological basis is Carpathian flysch – an undifferentiated grey-banded sandstone – with alluvial sediment from the Dunajec, Poprad, and Kamienica rivers in the valley basin.

Nowy Sącz is the governmental seat of Nowy Sącz County part of the Lesser Poland Voivodeship, Województwo Małopolskie since 1999. Between 1975 and 1998 it was the provincial seat of Nowy Sącz Voivodeship. Before that and during the Second Polish Republic, Nowy Sącz was a county seat in the Kraków Voivodeship. In 1951 it became a town with the rights of a county. It is the historic and tourist centre of Sądecczyzna, the Sądecki district.

Climate
Nowy Sącz has an oceanic climate  (Köppen climate classification: Cfb) using the  isotherm or a humid continental climate (Köppen climate classification: Dfb) using the  isotherm.

History

Nowy Sącz was founded on 8 November 1292 by the Polish and Bohemian ruler Wenceslaus II, on the site of an earlier village named Kamienica. The foundation of Nowy Sącz took place due to the efforts of Bishop of Kraków, who owned Kamienica. Upon request of the bishop, Wenceslaus II granted it Magdeburg rights, making it the only Polish town founded by the Bohemian king. Its name was taken from the nearby town of Stary Sącz. As early as 1329, the name was spelled Nowy Sandacz.

In the 14th and 15th century Nowy Sącz emerged as one of the most important economic and cultural centres of this part of the Kingdom of Poland. The town benefited from its proximity on the trade route to Hungary due to privileges granted by King Władysław I the Elbow-high, and later his son, Casimir III the Great, for supporting him during the Rebellion of wojt Albert in 1311–1312. During these times, the majority of the town's inhabitants were German colonists. In the 15th century it produced steel and woollen products, and nearly rivalled Kraków in visual arts. In 1329, Nowy Sącz signed a treaty with Kraków, upon which Kraków merchants, on their way to Hungary, had to stop at Nowy Sącz; Nowy Sącz merchants, on their way to Gdańsk, were obliged to stay at Kraków. In the mid-14th century, King Casimir the Great built a royal castle here and surrounded the town with a defensive wall. Nowy Sącz was the seat of a castellan and a starosta, becoming an important point in the system of defence of the southern border of Poland. The town was further elevated in 1448 when Bishop Zbigniew Oleśnicki promoted a local church to the status of a Collegiate. Nowy Sącz was a royal city of Poland, administratively located in the Kraków Voivodeship in the Lesser Poland Province of the Polish Crown.

Nowy Sącz prospered in the Polish Golden Age (16th century). It was an important centre of the Protestant Reformation. Local leader of the Polish Brethren, Stanisław Farnowski, was very popular among local nobility. Good times ended in the 17th century. In 1611 a great fire destroyed much of the town, and during the Swedish invasion of Poland, the town was captured by the Swedes (late 1655), who burned and looted it. Nowy Sącz was a centre of the rebellion against the invaders.

Partitions of Poland

The decline of the town continued in the 18th century, when Nowy Sącz suffered more destruction during the Great Northern War and the Bar Confederation, when the castle was burned. In 1772, during the First Partition of Poland, the town was annexed by the Habsburg Empire and made part of newly formed Galicia, where it remained until November 1918. Nowy Sącz rose to new prominence in the 19th century when the Austrian authorities built a railway connecting it with Vienna (1880s). Nowy Sącz was the seat of a county, new buildings were opened, the town was a rail hub with a large rail repair shop opened in 1876.

On April 17, 1894, the central part of Nowy Sącz burned in a fire, with a town hall and ancient town records. At that time, the town was important in Hasidic Jewish history for the founding of the Sanz Hasidic dynasty during the 19th century, the precursor to the Bobov dynasty founded in nearby Bobowa (with a synagogue with occasional services by Cracow congregation) and the Klausenberg dynasty.

World wars

At the beginning of World War I, Nowy Sącz was occupied by the Russian Army. The Russians were driven back by the Central Powers in December 1914. In the final stages of the war, on October 31–November 1, 1918, Poles stationed in the Austrian 10th Infantry Regiment in the city and local members of the secret Polish Military Organisation liberated it from Austrian rule, almost two weeks before Poland regained independence. Nowy Sącz and its surroundings, including Nowy Targ and Sanok, were claimed by the Lemko Republic (1918–1920) with capital in Florynka. Within interwar Poland the city saw industrial expansion and the railway factory expanded. In 1936, the Museum of Sącz Land was opened in the restored royal castle. Nowy Sącz had a population of around 34,000 in 1939.

During the invasion of Poland starting World War II, Nazi Germany carried out air raids on September 1–2, 1939, and then German troops entered the city on September 6. Afterwards, the German Einsatzgruppe I entered the city to commit various atrocities against the population, and then its members co-formed the local German police and security forces. Under German occupation the city was made part of the General Government. Poles expelled in December 1939 from several villages in the German-annexed Sieradz County were deported in freight trains to Nowy Sącz, while many locals were among Poles imprisoned in the infamous Montelupich Prison in Kraków and then murdered in the Krzesławice Fort of the Kraków Fortress, as part of the Intelligenzaktion. Because of its proximity to Slovakia, it lay on a major route for resistance fighters of the Polish Home Army. The Gestapo was active in capturing those trying to cross the border, including the murder of several Polish pilots. In June 1940, the resistance rescued Jan Karski from a hospital there, and a year later 32 people were shot in reprisal for the escape; several others were sent to concentration camps.

The regional Jewish community numbered about 25,000 before World War II, and nearly a third of the town's population was Jewish; ninety per cent of them died or did not return. The Nowy Sącz Ghetto for around 20,000 Jewish people was established by the German authorities near the castle. Its inhabitants were deported aboard Holocaust trains to Belzec extermination camp over three days in August 1942 and murdered. Across the river in the Jewish Cemetery, 300–500 Polish people were executed for their participation in the sheltering of Jews. Several Poles were also held by the occupiers in the local prison for helping Jews, before being deported to concentration camps.

The Red Army fought its way into the city on 20 January 1945. The city was restored to Poland, although with a Soviet-installed communist regime, which remained in power until the Fall of Communism in the 1980s. At war's end, about 60% of the city had been destroyed. Nowy Sącz was honoured for its heroism with the Cross of Grunwald, third class in 1946. In 1947 much of the Lemko population, living in villages southeast of the town, was deported in Action Vistula (mostly to land recently regained from Germany) in reaction to the nationalist Ukrainian activity in the region.

Economy

During the Polish communist regime, Nowy Sącz was the capital of Nowy Sącz Voivodeship (1975–98). In the 1950s the Polish authorities applied a special economic programme for the town, called the Nowy Sacz Experiment. The plan was to provide improvement and acceleration of the region's economic development, but it was only partially completed. The town was an important centre of the railway industry, and now contains one of the biggest railway engineering works in Poland. Since the social and political changes in Poland that started in 1989, the industry has faced economic problems.

Nowy Sącz is also important in the food industry, specialising in processing fruits, especially apples. Most of the factories were in the Biegonice district.  Now the local government is trying to change the structure of the industry, restructuring old factories and encouraging new companies to start up. This initiative also includes a move to the hi-tech industry. Nowy Sącz had one of the first computer companies in Poland, with the largest assembly plant in Europe, but this has closed due to ownership friction with the government. The building trade is also represented in the town, which has a major European window-manufacturer. Like all the bigger towns in Lesser Poland, it has seen a significant influx of the largest European grocery chains.

A main economic problem now is the high level of unemployment which, officially about 20%, is one of the highest in the European Union. Recently the local government has tried to address the persistent economic and social problems of the local Romani community, including access to utilities and education.

Tourism

The city has many historic features, including one of the largest marketplaces in Europe after Kraków, along with one of the largest old squares in Poland; the late 19th century Ratusz (city hall) is centred in the square. Other points of interest include:
 Saint Margaret's Basilica (Bazylika kolegiacka Św. Małgorzaty), a Gothic church from the 15th century. The coat of arms shows St. Margaret and a dragon; her name day is July 20.
 A 15th-century Gothic House (Dom Gotycki) containing a regional museum.
 A gothic Franciscan church.
 The Great Synagogue, dating from 1746, now the Galeria Dawna Synagoga, a gallery with some historical displays. There is a memorial tablet on the front in Polish, Hebrew, and Yiddish.  Across the Kamienica River is the Jewish cemetery.
 Saint Roch, a church of wooden construction from the 15th century, in the Dąbrówka district.  The old cemetery chapel St. Helen's Church is another example.
 The partially restored ruins of a mediæval Royal Castle from the 14th century during the reign of Kazimierz the Great. It was destroyed in 1945 at the end of World War II when it was used as a German ammunition store and was the site of mass executions.  There are also the remains of the city walls nearby.
 An open-air museum or skansen (Sądecki Park Etnograficzny), containing a village of relocated authentic structures recreating indigenous architecture, customs, and folk culture from the region.  Of particular note are the wooden churches, including an Orthodox church and the Roma (Gypsy) village.
 Stary Sącz (Old Sącz)  to the south, founded in 1163 but smaller than Nowy (New) Sącz, has a charming cobbled market square, with a convent of Poor Clares to the east.
 There are also several routes emphasising wooden churches in the region of note.

The mountainous country around Nowy Sącz is also popular with tourists, hikers and skiers, especially the Beskid Sądecki mountains (part of the Carpathians), of which the highest peak is Radziejowa ( above sea level). Nearby popular mountain resorts include Krynica-Zdrój and Piwniczna-Zdrój ("Zdrój" means "health spa").
To the north of the lake is the Ciężkowice-Rożnów Landscape Park (Park Ciężkowicko-Rożnowski). An annual festival of dance featuring children from highland regions from around the world takes place in July.

Sports
 Sandecja Nowy Sacz – a football team, currently in the Polish First Division
 KS Dunajec/Start Nowy Sacz – a football team, playing in the local league
 MKS Beskid Nowy Sącz – a handball team, playing in the Polish First Division
 Olimpia Nowy Sacz – a handball team, playing in the Polish First Division
 UKS Dwójka Nowy Sacz – a handball team, playing in the Polish Second Division
 RC Czarno Biali – a rugby team, playing in the Polish Second Division
 SKS Start Nowy Sącz – a whitewater kayaking club
 NS Backyard Wrestling – a local wrestling federation

Education 
 Wyższa Szkoła Biznesu - National-Louis University — a business college with a strong emphasis on English. It has American accreditation.
 Państwowa Wyższa Szkoła Zawodowa
 Wyższa Szkoła Przedsiębiorczości
 ZSEM "Elektryk" Technikum nr 7, Technical Secondary School of Electronics and Mechatronics. Best school of that type in the whole of Poland in 2014 by Educational Foundation "Perspektywy" ratings.

Notable people 

 Arthur Berson (1859–1942), German meteorologist
 Bolesław Barbacki (1891–1941), Polish painter, actor, director
 Pinchas Burstein (1927–1977), later known as Maryan S. Maryan, Jewish-American artist and Holocaust survivor
 Chaim Halberstam (1793–1876), Hasidic rebbe
 Carl Menger (1840–1921), Founder of Austrian School of Economics 
 Władysław Hasior (1928–1999), Polish artist and sculptor
 Dawid Janczyk (born 1987), Polish international football player
 Majka Jeżowska (born 1960), Polish singer
 Joanna Kanska (born 1959), Polish-British actress
 Władysław Kiełbasa (1893–1939), lieutenant colonel in the Polish Army
 Janusz Kowalik (born 1944), Polish footballer for KS Cracovia and first ever MVP of the NASL in 1968
 Adam Kossowski (1905–1986), Polish artist
 Władysław Lizoń (born 1954), Canadian Member of Parliament, Former National president of the Canadian Polish Congress
 Aleksander Michał Lubomirski (?–1675), Starost of Nowy Sącz
 Jerzy Aleksander Lubomirski (?–1735), Starost of Nowy Sącz
 Stanisław Lubomirski (?–1585), Starost
 Raphael Mahler (1899–1977), historian
 Mariusz Mężyk (born 1983), footballer
 Józef Ogórek (born 1948), Polish Sculptor
 Józef Oleksy (1946–2015), Polish Prime Minister
 Efraim Racker (1913–1991), biochemist  
 Zygmunt Tarło ( or –1628), Kasztelan of Nowy Sącz
 Piotr Świerczewski (born 1972), Polish international football player

Twin towns – sister cities

Nowy Sącz is twinned with:

 Columbia County, Georgia, United States
 Elbląg, Poland
 Gabrovo, Bulgaria
 Kiskunhalas, Hungary
 Narvik, Norway
 Netanya, Israel
 Prešov, Slovakia
 Stará Ľubovňa, Slovakia
 Stryi, Ukraine
 Suzhou, China
 Tarnów, Poland
 Trakai, Lithuania
 La Baule-Escoublac, France
 The Wirral, United Kingdom

Former twin cities:
 Schwerte, Germany

In May 2020, the German city of Schwerte suspended its city partnership with Nowy Sącz after 30 years of cooperation due to the town's adoption of a resolution discriminating LGBT people.

See also
 Bacza
 Multimedia City

References

External links 

 English version of official webpage
 Jewish Community in Nowy Sącz on Virtual Shtetl
 

 
City counties of Poland
Cities and towns in Lesser Poland Voivodeship
Kraków Voivodeship (14th century – 1795)
Kingdom of Galicia and Lodomeria
Kraków Voivodeship (1919–1939)
1292 establishments in Europe
Holocaust locations in Poland
13th-century establishments in Poland
Jewish communities destroyed in the Holocaust